Henrik Bundgaard (born 20 March 1975) is a former Danish professional football goalkeeper.

External links
Danish Superliga statistics

1975 births
Living people
Danish men's footballers
Aabyhøj IF players
AC Horsens players
Aarhus Gymnastikforening players
Danish Superliga players
Brabrand IF players
Association football goalkeepers